Felix Loch (born 24 July 1989) is a German luger and Olympic champion. He has been competing since 1995 and on the German national team since 2006. He has won fourteen medals at the FIL World Luge Championships with twelve golds (Men's singles: 2008, 2009, 2012, 2013, 2015, 2016; Men's sprint 2016:  Mixed team event: 2008, 2009, 2012, 2013, 2015, 2016) and two silvers (Men's singles: 2011, 2015). Loch's men's singles win in 2008 made him the youngest world champion ever at 18 years old. He is the youngest Olympic Gold Medalist in men's luge history. As of 2022, Loch is a triple Olympic gold medalist.

Career
At the 2008 FIL European Luge Championships in Cesana, Italy, he finished sixth in the men's singles event.

Previously he had won the 2006 Junior World Championship held in Altenberg, Germany. Loch is a member of the Club RC Berchtesgaden and currently lives at Schönau am Königssee though he was born in Sonneberg.

During International Training Week at the Whistler Sliding Centre in Whistler, British Columbia on 7–15 November 2008, Loch injured his shoulder during training. Bob- und Schlittenverband für Deutschland (BSD) Sport Director Thomas Schwab stated that Loch would compete at the opening Luge World Cup event at Igls, Austria on 29–30 November 2008 to which Loch did.

On 21 February 2009, during the 2008-09 Luge World Cup season finale at Whistler Sliding Centre, Felix Loch recorded the fastest registered speed in luge, .

At the 2014 Winter Olympics in Sochi, Russia, Loch again won the gold medal in men's Singles, marking his second consecutive Olympic victory, and he was also in the German team which won gold in the inaugural team relay.

At the 2018 Winter Olympics, in the men's singles competition, Loch was a heavy favorite and indeed was leading the field after three runs, but in the last run made a mistake that cost him a medal. He ended in the fifth position.

Luge results

Olympic Games

World Championships
20 medals – (14 gold, 5 silver, 1 bronze)

World Cup

References

External links

1989 births
Living people
People from Sonneberg
People from Bezirk Suhl
German male lugers
Sportspeople from Thuringia
Olympic lugers of Germany
Lugers at the 2010 Winter Olympics
Lugers at the 2014 Winter Olympics
Lugers at the 2018 Winter Olympics
Lugers at the 2022 Winter Olympics
Olympic gold medalists for Germany
Olympic medalists in luge
Medalists at the 2010 Winter Olympics
Medalists at the 2014 Winter Olympics
Recipients of the Silver Laurel Leaf
21st-century German people